In mathematics, a Riemann–Roch theorem for smooth manifolds is a version of results such as the Hirzebruch–Riemann–Roch theorem or Grothendieck–Riemann–Roch theorem (GRR) without a hypothesis making the smooth manifolds involved carry a complex structure. Results of this kind were obtained by Michael Atiyah and Friedrich Hirzebruch in 1959, reducing the requirements to something like a spin structure.

Formulation

Let X and Y be oriented smooth closed manifolds,
and f: X → Y a continuous map.
Let vf=f*(TY) − TX in the K-group 
K(X).
If dim(X) ≡ dim(Y) mod 2, then

where ch is the Chern character, d(vf) an element of 
the integral cohomology group H2(Y, Z) satisfying
d(vf) ≡ f* w2(TY)-w2(TX) mod 2,
fK* the Gysin homomorphism for K-theory,
and fH* the Gysin homomorphism for cohomology
.
This theorem was first proven by Atiyah and Hirzebruch.

The theorem is proven by considering several special cases. 
If Y is the Thom space of a vector bundle V over X,
then the Gysin maps are just the Thom isomorphism.
Then, using the splitting principle, it suffices to check the theorem via explicit computation for line
bundles.

If f: X → Y is an embedding, then the 
Thom space of the normal bundle of X in Y can be viewed as a tubular neighborhood of X
in Y, and excision gives a map

and
.
The Gysin map for K-theory/cohomology is defined to be the composition of the Thom isomorphism with these maps.
Since the theorem holds for the map from X to the Thom space of N,
and since the Chern character commutes with u and v, the theorem is also true for embeddings.
f: X → Y.

Finally, we can factor a general map f: X → Y
into an embedding 

and the projection

The theorem is true for the embedding.
The Gysin map for the projection is the Bott-periodicity isomorphism, which commutes with the Chern character,
so the theorem holds in this general case also.

Corollaries

Atiyah and Hirzebruch then specialised and refined in the case X = a point, where the condition becomes the existence of a spin structure on Y. Corollaries are on Pontryagin classes and the J-homomorphism.

Notes

Theorems in differential geometry
Algebraic surfaces
Bernhard Riemann